Paramartyria is a genus of small primitive metallic moths in the family Micropterigidae. They occur in southern and eastern China, Taiwan, and Japan.

Species
There are eight species:
Paramartyria anmashana Hashimoto, 2000
Paramartyria bimaculella Issiki, 1931 
Paramartyria chekiangella Kaltenbach & Speidel, 1982 
Paramartyria cipingana Yang, 1980
Paramartyria immaculatella Issiki, 1931 
Paramartyria maculatella Issiki, 1931 
Paramartyria ovalella Issiki, 1931 
Paramartyria semifasciella Issiki, 1931

References

Micropterigidae
Moth genera